Hoplophthiracarus is a genus of mites in the family Steganacaridae.

Species

 Hoplophthiracarus bisulcus Niedbała, 1993

References

Further reading

Acari genera
Acari of New Zealand
Sarcoptiformes